Palorus subdepressus, the depressed flour beetle, is a species of darkling beetle in the family Tenebrionidae. It is found in Europe and North America.

References

Further reading

 

Tenebrioninae
Articles created by Qbugbot
Beetles described in 1864